Feliks Hostegovi Tsolakyan (born 27 January 1952) is an Armenian political figure and the current Minister of Emergency Situations.

On 1 May 2018, Tsolakyan was the sole member of the Republican Party of Armenia caucus who voted in favour of electing Nikol Pashinyan to the position of Prime Minister.

Early life and professional career 
Tsolakyan was born in the village of Nerkin Dzhrapi, Ani region of Armenian SSR, Soviet Union. Tsolakyan graduated from the History department of Yerevan State University in 1974.

Tsolakyan began his career at the Ararat Industrial and Technological College upon his graduation in 1974. In 1980, he joined the State Security Committee, where he served in police services in Goris and Yeghegnadzor. In 1996, he headed the State Security Committee of the Shirak region, before heading the Control Service of the President of the Republic of the Armenia in 1999.  From 2003 to 2007, he headed the State Tax Service.  From 2007 to 2013, he was the Deputy Director of the National Security Service in the Armenian civil service.

Political career 

In 2013, he was appointed Governor of the Shirak marz, where he served until 2016.  He was elected to the National Assembly in the 2017 Armenian parliamentary election, representing the 11th electoral district (Shirak), under the Republican Party of Armenia's electoral list. Tsolakyan was appointed as Minister of Emergency Situations of Armenia on 4 October 2018, following the removal of his predecessor by Prime Minister Nikol Pashinyan.

Awards 
2005: Anania Shirakatsi Medal

2016: Medal “For Services Contributed to the Motherland”

References

Living people
1952 births
Armenian Soviet Socialist Republic people
People from Shirak Province